Muellerina may refer to:
 Muellerina (plant), a genus of parasitic shrubs in the family Loranthaceae endemic to Australia
 Muellerina (crustacean), a genus of marine ostracods in the family Hemicytheridae